Vasile Balan was a Moldovan politician. He died in June 2012.

Biography 

He has been a member of the Parliament of Moldova since 2009.

External links 
 Site-ul Parlamentului Republicii Moldova
 Alianţa Moldova Noastră

References

1950 births
Living people
Our Moldova Alliance politicians
Moldovan MPs 2009–2010